Paris Bowdler (born 24 November 2004) is an Australian cricketer who currently plays for Melbourne Renegades. She plays as a wicket-keeper and right-handed batter.

Domestic career
In October 2022, Bowdler was called up to the Melbourne Renegades squad in the Women's Big Bash League as a replacement for injured wicket-keeper Josie Dooley. She had already impressed the Renegades set-up by reaching the final of Renegades Recruit earlier in 2022, a program that aimed to uncover upcoming cricket talent in Victoria. She made her debut for the side on 30 October 2022, against Sydney Sixers, in which she kept wicket and scored 2*.

International career
In December 2022, Bowdler was selected in the Australia Under-19 squad for the 2023 ICC Under-19 Women's T20 World Cup. She went on to play two matches at the tournament.

References

External links

2004 births
Living people
Place of birth missing (living people)
Australian women cricketers
Melbourne Renegades (WBBL) cricketers